Earl of Sunderland is a title that has been created twice in the Peerage of England. The first creation came in 1627 in favour of Emanuel Scrope, 11th Baron Scrope of Bolton. The earldom became extinct on his death in 1630 while the barony became either extinct or dormant (see Baron Scrope of Bolton for more information on this title). The second creation came in 1643 in favour of the Royalist soldier Henry Spencer, 3rd Baron Spencer of Wormleighton. The Spencer family descended from Sir John Spencer (d. 1522) who acquired the Wormleighton estate in Warwickshire and the Althorp estate in Northamptonshire. His grandson Sir John Spencer (d. 1586) was a Knight of the Shire for Northamptonshire. The latter's grandson Sir Robert Spencer represented Brackley in Parliament in the late 16th century. In 1603 Sir Robert was raised to the Peerage of England as Baron Spencer of Wormleighton. He was succeeded by his eldest surviving son, William, the second Baron. He had previously represented Northamptonshire in Parliament. His eldest son was the aforementioned third Baron. In July 1643 he was created Earl of Sunderland in the Peerage of England. Lord Sunderland was killed at the Battle of Newbury in September of the same year. He was succeeded by his two-year-old only son, Robert, the second Earl. He later gained great distinction as a statesman and notably served four times as Secretary of State for the Southern Department.

His eldest surviving son, Charles, the third Earl, also gained prominence as a statesman. He was Lord-Lieutenant of Ireland, Lord Privy Seal, Secretary of State for both the Northern and Southern Departments, Lord President of the Council and First Lord of the Treasury. However, his political career was ruined by the South Sea Bubble of 1720. Lord Sunderland married as his second wife Lady Anne Churchill, second daughter of the distinguished soldier John Churchill, 1st Duke of Marlborough and Sarah Jennings. The dukedom of Marlborough was allowed to descend to the Duke's daughters and their sons after a special Act of Parliament was passed in 1716. Sunderland was succeeded by his eldest surviving son by his second wife, Robert, the fourth Earl. He died unmarried in 1729 at the age of 27 and was succeeded by his younger brother, Charles, the fifth Earl. In 1733 he succeeded his maternal aunt Henrietta Godolphin, 2nd Duchess of Marlborough as third Duke of Marlborough. The barony of Spencer of Wormleighton and earldom of Sunderland have remained subsidiary titles of the dukedom ever since. Earl of Sunderland has been used as the courtesy title by the Duke's grandson.

John Spencer, fourth son of the third Earl of Sunderland by his second wife, succeeded to the family estates in Northamptonshire in 1733 after his elder brother inherited the dukedom of Marlborough. His son John was created Earl Spencer in 1765. Robert Spencer, second son of the second Baron, was created Viscount Teviot in 1685.

Earls of Sunderland; First creation (1627)
Emanuel Scrope, 1st Earl of Sunderland (d. 1630)

Barons Spencer of Wormleighton (1603)
Robert Spencer, 1st Baron Spencer of Wormleighton (1570–1627)
John Spencer (1590–1610)
William Spencer, 2nd Baron Spencer of Wormleighton (1592–1636)
Henry Spencer, 3rd Baron Spencer of Wormleighton (1620–1643) (created Earl of Sunderland in 1643)

Earls of Sunderland; Second creation (1643)
Henry Spencer, 1st Earl of Sunderland (1620–1643)   
Robert Spencer, 2nd Earl of Sunderland (1640–1702)
Robert Spencer, Lord Spencer (1666–1688)
Charles Spencer, 3rd Earl of Sunderland (1675–1722)
Robert Spencer (1700–1701)
Robert Spencer, 4th Earl of Sunderland (1701–1729)
Charles Spencer, 5th Earl of Sunderland (1706–1758) (succeeded as Duke of Marlborough in 1733)

For further succession, see Duke of Marlborough (title).

References

Extinct earldoms in the Peerage of England
Spencer family
Earldoms in the Peerage of England
Noble titles created in 1627
Noble titles created in 1643